The Song of the Xianbei Brother is a popular song of the Xianbei people composed by Murong Hui in 285 AD. It is preserved in Chinese translation and is about the Xianbei chief's regrets for having sent his brother away to the West. The original Chinese translation left the Xianbei word for elder brother (A-kan) in the title, which is identical to the Mongolic word for elder brother (Aqan or Aghan). The same word exists in Turkic languages and Tungusic languages.The song was first translated into English in 1939.

English translation

Background of the song 
The separation of Tuyuhun from the Murong Xianbei occurred during the Western Jin Dynasty (266-316), which succeeded the Cao Wei (220-265) in northern China. Legends accounted the separation as caused by a fight between Tuyuhun's horses and those of his younger brother, Murong Hui. The actual cause was intense struggle over the Khanate position and disagreement over their future directions. The fraction that supported Murong Hui for the Khanate position aimed at ruling over China, whereas Tuyuhu intended to preserve the Xianbei culture and lifestyle. The disagreement resulted in Tuyuhu being proclaimed as Khan, or Kehan, and he eventually undertook the long westward journey under the title of the Prince of Jin, or Jin Wang, followed by other Xianbei and Wuhuan groups. While passing through western Liaoning and Mt. Bai, more Xianbei groups joined them from the Duan, Yuwen, and Bai sections. At the Hetao Plains near Ordos in Inner Mongolia, Tuyuhun Khan led them to reside by Mt. Yin for over thirty years, as the Tuoba Xianbei and Northern Xianbei joined them through political and marriage alliances. After settling down in the northwest, they established the powerful Tuyuhun Kingdom named to his honor as the first Khan who led them there, by subjugating the native peoples who were summarily referred to as the “Qiang” and included more than 100 different and loosely coordinated tribes that did not submitted to each other or any authorities.

After Tuyuhun Khan departed from the northeast, Murong Hui composed an “Older Brother’s Song,” or “the Song of A Gan:” “A Gan” is Chinese transcription of “a ga” for “older brother” in the Xianbei language. The song lamented his sadness and longing for Tuyuhun. Legends accounted that Murong Hui often sang it until he died and the song got spread into central and northwest China. The Murong Xianbei whom he had led successively founded the Former Yan (281-370), Western Yan (384-394), Later Yan (383-407), and Southern Yan (398-410).

References 
Simon Wickham-Smith and Sh.Tsog. The Best of Mongolian Poetry. Ulaanbaatar, 2007.

Mongolian literature